The Rappehorn (also known as Mittaghorn) is a mountain of the Lepontine Alps, located in the canton of Valais, west of the Blinnenhorn.

References

External links
Rappehorn on Hikr

Mountains of the Alps
Alpine three-thousanders
Mountains of Switzerland
Mountains of Valais
Lepontine Alps